The Ruota d'Oro is a professional one day cycling race held annually in Italy. It is part of UCI Europe Tour in category 1.2U. It was held as a stage race from 1978 to 1990.

Winners

References

Cycle races in Italy
UCI Europe Tour races
Recurring sporting events established in 1978
1978 establishments in Italy